The Foxhollow School was a private boarding school for girls.  Founded by Aileen M. Farrell in 1930 on the Foxhollow Farm in Rhinebeck, New York.  The school was moved to the Lenox, Massachusetts former estate of the Alfred Gwynne Vanderbilt family. The school expanded to the neighboring property, The Mount. Miss Farrell was a British citizen and Oxford University graduate, who never sought American citizenship.  She led the school for forty years until 1970. The school closed in 1976 and the property became an inn.  In 2017, it was announced the building would be converted to luxury apartments.

Foxhollow School was one of several private secondary schools in the vicinity that occupied the properties of Gilded Age estates to close in the 1970s.  These schools included Stockbridge School, Windsor Mountain School, Lenox School for Boys and Cranwell Preparatory School. The costs of maintaining these grand Berkshire Cottages and their sprawling grounds was one of the contributing causes of their closures.

Notable alumni
Joan W. Patten

References

1930 establishments in New York (state)
1976 establishments in Massachusetts
Boarding schools in Massachusetts
Boarding schools in New York (state)
Buildings and structures in Lenox, Massachusetts
Buildings and structures in Rhinebeck, New York
Defunct boarding schools
Defunct girls' schools in the United States
Defunct private schools in the United States
Defunct high schools in the United States
Educational institutions established in 1930
Educational institutions disestablished in 1976
Girls boarding schools
Girls' schools in Massachusetts
Preparatory schools in New York (state)
Private boarding schools in the United States
Private high schools in Dutchess County, New York
Private high schools in Massachusetts
Private preparatory schools in Massachusetts
Schools in Berkshire County, Massachusetts